The Ultralight Engineering Astra is an American high-wing, tricycle landing gear, cable-braced, single-seat, open cockpit, single engine in pusher configuration, ultralight aircraft that was designed and produced by Ultralight Engineering in the 1980s. The aircraft was supplied as a kit for amateur construction.

Design and development
Like many ultralights of the early 1980s, it was derived from the Eipper Quicksilver and generally resembles that aircraft. The Astra primarily improved upon the Quicksilver in its main landing gear design, which is suspended by coil springs to reduce the chances of damage during rough landings.

The airframe is made from bolted-together aluminium tubing and covered in Dacron sailcloth. The  span wing is braced by cables from a kingpost. The controls are three-axis, with roll controlled by three small spoilers mounted on each wing. The aircraft can be assembled or disassembled for storage or ground transportation by two people in fifteen minutes.

Ultralight Engineering went out of business after the fatal crash of a prototype of another design and production of the Astra ended at the same time.

Specifications (Astra)

References

1980s United States ultralight aircraft
Homebuilt aircraft